Vincent J. Freda (16 December 1927 – 7 May 2003) was an American obstetrician who shared the 1980 Lasker-DeBakey Clinical Medical Research Award for pioneering work on the rhesus blood group system, the role of rhesus D antibodies in the causation of Rh disease and the prevention of Rh disease. He graduated from Columbia University and the New York University School of Medicine.

References

1927 births
2003 deaths
Columbia University alumni
New York University Grossman School of Medicine alumni
Recipients of the Lasker-DeBakey Clinical Medical Research Award
American obstetricians